Help Me Make It Through the Night is the twelfth album led by saxophonist Hank Crawford and his first released on the Kudu label in 1972.

Reception

AllMusic awarded the album 4 stars stating "This 1972 set by Crawford is an exemplary portrait of his movin' and groovin' style".

Track listing
 "Help Me Make It Through the Night" (Kris Kristofferson) - 5:40
 "Brian's Song" (Michel Legrand) - 3:25
 "Uncle Funky" (Hank Crawford) - 5:32
 "In the Wee Small Hours of the Morning" (John Moon Elliott, Inez James) - 2:48
 "Go Away Little Girl" (Gerry Goffin, Carole King) - 4:20
 "Imagine" (John Lennon) - 4:05
 "Ham" (Pee Wee Ellis) - 3:07
 "The Sun Died" (Hubert Giraud, Pierre Delanoë, Ray Charles, Ann Gregory) - 4:05

Personnel 
Hank Crawford - alto saxophone
Al DeRisi, Snooky Young - trumpet (track 7)
Wayne Andre - trombone (track 7)
Grover Washington, Jr. - tenor saxophone (track 7)
Pepper Adams - baritone saxophone (track 7)
Richard Tee - piano, electric piano, organ
Cornell Dupree (tracks 1-6 & 8), Eric Gale (track 7) - electric guitar
Ron Carter - bass, electric bass
Phil Kraus - vibraphone (tracks 1, 4 & 5)
Idris Muhammad (track 7), Bernard Purdie (tracks 1-6 & 8) - drums
Airto Moreira - percussion (track 7)
Bernard Eichen, Felix Giglio, Emanuel Green, Harold Kohon, Harry Lookofsky, Joe Malin, Gene Orloff, Max Polikoff, Rlliot Rosoff - violin (tracks 1-6 & 8)
Alfred Brown, Theodore Israel, Emanuel Vardi - viola (tracks 1-6 & 8)
Charles McCracken, George Ricci - cello (tracks 1-6 & 8)
Pee Wee Ellis (track 7), Don Sebesky (tracks 1-6 & 8) - arranger, conductor

References 

1972 albums
Hank Crawford albums
Kudu Records albums
Albums produced by Creed Taylor
Albums arranged by Don Sebesky
Albums recorded at Van Gelder Studio